is an original video animation based on the Teenage Mutant Ninja Turtles franchise.  The first episode is based on the Supermutants line while the second episode is based on the Metal Mutation line. The OVA was produced by Bee Media and Tsuburaya Productions. The OVA features most of the same cast as TV Tokyo's Japanese dub of the 1987 TV series, most notably Hideyuki Umezu.

Voice cast
 Daiki Nakamura as Leonardo
 Kappei Yamaguchi as Michelangelo
 Hidenari Ugaki as Donatello
 Hiroyuki Shibamoto as Raphael
 Hideyuki Umezu as Splinter and Krang
 Emi Shinohara as April O'Neil
 Kiyoyuki Yanada as Saki Oroku / Shredder
 Kyousei Tsukui as Bebop
 Hidetoshi Nakamura as Rocksteady
 Rei Sakuma as Crys-Mu / Dark Mu
 Tomohiro Nishimura as Hattori Kinzô
 Kōichi Nagano as News Technician

Episode list

Music

Soundtrack

 is the licensed soundtrack from the OAV. It was released by Columbia Records on March 20, 1996, in Japan only. This album includes the score from both episodes by composer Takashi Ike. Also included is the opening theme "Power Up Turtles" and the closing theme "Chikyū wa Ogenki" by Hironobu Kageyama and "Mokkun" respectively.

Track list
パワーアップ・タートルズ~オープニング・テーマ・ビデオサイズPawā Appu Tātoruzu~Ōpuningu Tēma Bideo Saizu/Power Up Turtles: Opening Theme Video Size
戦いのはじまり~ダーク・ミューの驚異Tatakai no Hajimari~Dāku Myū no Kyô/Start to Wage War: Dark Mu's Miracle
ダーク・ミューの目覚めDāku Myū no Mezame/Awakening of Dark Mu
負けるなスーパータートルズ!~セイントミューテーションでタートルセイント!!Makeru na Sūpā Tātoruzu!~Seinto Myūtēshon de Tātoruzu Seinto/Defeated Super Turtles!: The Saint Mutation of the Turtle Saint!!
クリス・ミュー決死の封印~力をあわせてメガファイナルセイントブレイクを打て!!Kurisu Myū Ketsu Shi no Fūin~Ryoku o awase te Mega Fainaru Seinto Bureiku o Ute!!/Crys Mu Decides the Seal's Death: The Combined Power Mega Final Saint Break Strike Shoots!!
美雄平石(ミュータ石)を求め,いざ日本へ~ハットリキンゾウ参上!Bi Osu Hira Ishi(Myūta Seki) wo Motome, Iza Nihon e~Hattori Kinzô Sôjyô/The Beautiful Flat Male Animal Stones (Mutant Stones) Demand, to Japan in a Crucial Moment: Hattori Kinzô Visits!
亡霊ユキムラのいたずらBôrei Yukimura no Itazura/Failed Attempt of Ghost Yukimura
大苦戦!お先に失礼,メタルビーストはいただきさ!!Dai Kusen! Osaki ni Shitsurei, Metaru Bīsuto ha Itadaki sa!!/Big, Hard Fight! Before Rudeness, the Metal Beast is Received!
守護獣降臨!メタルミューテーション!!Shugo jū Kôrin! Metaru Myūtēshon!!/Protect the Beast Descending to Attend! Metal Mutation!!
地球はお元気~エンディング・テーマ・ビデオサイズChikyū wa Ogenki~Endingu Tēma Bideo Saizu/The Earth is Safe: Ending Theme Video Size

References

External links
 
 

1996 anime OVAs
Adventure anime and manga
Animated films about turtles
Comedy anime and manga
Ninja in anime and manga
Science fiction anime and manga
Superheroes in anime and manga
Teenage Mutant Ninja Turtles television series
Tsuburaya Productions